Nicholas Mynn (fl. 1558–1572), of Little Walsingham, Norfolk, was an English politician.

Life
Mynn was the son of John Mynn of Woodcote, Surrey. He married Elizabeth, a widow and the daughter of MP, Robert Drury. They had three sons and three daughters.

Career
Mynn was a servant of Thomas Howard, 4th Duke of Norfolk.

He was a Member (MP) of the Parliament of England for Morpeth in 1571, Bramber in 1558, Horsham in 1559, New Shoreham in 1563, and Castle Rising in 1572.

References

Year of birth missing
Year of death missing
People from Walsingham
English MPs 1558
English MPs 1559
English MPs 1563–1567
English MPs 1571
English MPs 1572–1583